India–Kazakhstan relations) 
, also referred to as Indian-Kazakhstani relations or Indo-Kazakhstani relations, are the bilateral relations between the Republic of India and the Republic of Kazakhstan. Diplomatic relations have increased in significance in the 21st century after initially remaining passive in the 1990s. Both nations seek to develop an extensive commercial and strategic partnership in the Central Asia region.

History

India recognised the independence of Kazakhstan from the Soviet Union after the latter's dissolution in 1992, despite being one of the very closest friendly allies with the Soviets during much of the Cold War. In recent years, India has sought to increase its commerce and strategic ties with Kazakhstan, which is the second largest nation of the former Soviet republics and occupies a major expanse of territory in Central Asia with extensive oil, natural gas and mineral reserves. India has sought to expand ties after mounting concern over the growth of the economic and strategic influence of the People's Republic of China. In 2002, Nursultan Nazarbayev made an official visit to India and in the same year, the Indian Prime Minister Atal Bihari Vajpayee attended the summit of the Conference on Interaction and Confidence-Building Measures in Asia in the Kazakhstan's former capital city, Almaty.

Development of bilateral relations
As of 2003, Indian–Kazakhstani trade stands at $78,910,000. To bolster commerce, both nations have established the Indo-Kazakh Joint Business Council. Although India failed to acquire equity in the Kurmangazy oil field, the Oil and Natural Gas Corporation of India is set to acquire a stake in the Satpayev field. The Kazakh national firm KazmunayGaz had offered the ONGC a choice between Satpayev and Makhambet fields and has asked for Indian participation in petrochemical industrial projects in the Atirau and Akhtau regions. Both nations have also sought to establish extensive collaboration and commerce in information technology, space research, banking and increasing volume of bilateral trade. India has offered Kazakhstan $1,000,000,000 in loans while the latter has granted major tax concessions to Indian companies. Kazakhstan has also sought to negotiate a multilateral agreement with Iran and Turkmenistan to create a transport corridor to India to ensure a reliable trade route and provide Kazakhstan commercial and shipping access to the warm water ports of India.

India is working towards the development of its civilian nuclear energy industry as a clean alternative to satisfy its huge energy needs. Since Kazakhstan has plenty of the uranium required for nuclear energy, India is developing a strong relationship with Kazakhstan. India invited the Kazakh President for the Republic Day celebrations in New Delhi, in January 2009.

Trade balance

Major products exported to Kazakhstan by India include pharmaceuticals, medical products, Tea, Telephone apparatus, Raw tobacco and construction machinery. Major Exports from Kazakhstan and imported by India include: petroleum oils, oils from bituminous minerals; radioactive chemical elements; asbestos and titanium.

Kazakhstan is the largest supplier of uranium to India providing 5,000 tonnes during 2015–19.

Humanitarian Assistance

COVID-19
Kazakhstan sent medical equipment and protective gear to India in response to the surging new COVID-19 cases experienced in May 2021.

Strategic co-operation
India and Kazakhstan have developed close collaboration in fighting religious terrorism an extremism, as well as in promoting regional security. A joint memorandum signed in December 2002 enabled joint projects such as training military officers, developing joint military-industrial projects and establishing a partnership between the defence industries of India and Kazakhstan. India has also provided support and emerged as a partner in Kazakhstan's bid to develop a naval fleet in the Caspian Sea, despite opposition from Kazakhstan's northern neighbour, Russia. The Kazakhstan President Nursultan Nazarbayev visited India in January 2009 and a civil nuclear pact were made with India under which the uranium-rich Central Asian country will supply fuel to atomic plants in India.

The two countries held the Prabal Dostyk joint military exercises in Kazakhstan in 2016 and the Himachal Pradesh region in 2017.

Kazakhstan and TAPI
India has broached the idea of a hydrocarbon pipeline with Kazakhstan that would bring fuel through a five-nation route.  India unveiled the concept of the pipeline, which in future could be extended to Russia, during a meeting between External Affairs Minister Salman Khurshid and his visiting Kazakh counterpart Erlan Idrissov. The two Ministers will revisit the idea when they will meet twice in the coming months — first on the sidelines of the Istanbul process meeting on Afghanistan in Almaty and later during a stand-alone visit by Mr. Khurshid to the Kazakh capital of Astana.

It will head from the former Silk Road caravanserai city of Shymkent, known today for oil refining, and enter Uzbekistan. From there it will go to Afghanistan and then follow the route to be taken by the TAPI pipeline into India via Pakistan. Officials said currently most hydrocarbon pipelines from Central Asia are on an east–west axis. This pipeline will, like TAPI, be on a north–south axis, providing a new route to South Asia for hydrocarbons extracted from Central Asia.

Indian Ambassadors to Kazakhstan  
 Rajiv Sikri (1995-1999)
 Syed Raza Hashim (1999-2002)
 Vidya Sagar Verma (2002-2004)
 Asoke Kumar Mukherjee (2004-2007)
 Ashok Sajjanhar (2007-2010)
 Ashok Kumar Sharma (2011-2014)
 Harsh Kumar Jain (2014-2017)
 Prabhat Kumar (2017-2021)
 Shubdarshini Tripati (2021-present)

References

 
Bilateral relations of Kazakhstan
Kazakhstan